Chale is a village and civil parish on the Isle of Wight of England, in the United Kingdom. It is located three kilometres from Niton in the south of the Island in the area known as the Back of the Wight. The village of Chale lies at the foot of St. Catherine's Down.

History

Chale is recorded in the Domesday book as "Cela", which probably derives from the Old English word "ceole", meaning "throat". This is thought to refer to the nearby ravine or chine at Blackgang. The name was also recorded as "Chele" or "Chielle", but it has been "Chale" since the 12th century.

There were 3 manors in Chale at the time of the Domesday Book: Chale, Gotten and Walpen.

The Parish Church of St Andrew was founded by Hugh Gendon in Chale in 1114. However, the present church dates from the 14th century. It has 6 bells in its tower. One might have been made about 1360. It has some fine stained glass windows.

The Chale Abbey farm has a window that dates from the 14th century. The name Abbey refers to the style of the building, not its religious use. Chale Abbey Farm and Walpen Manor are two of the oldest buildings on the Isle of Wight.

In 1456, John Goodyear, parson of Chale, donated an alabaster altarpiece depicting the main episodes in the life of the Apostle Saint James the Greater, to the Cathedral of Santiago de Compostela, Spain, where it is preserved today.

The south coast of the Isle of Wight has seen many shipwrecks because it has some famous rocky outcroppings. Lord William de Godeton removed some casks of wine from a French shipwreck in 1312. However, this wine was the property of the Church, which forced Godeton to build a tower and an octagonal oratory at the top of the cliffs above Chale on St. Catherine's Down. A fire was maintained in the oratory to prevent further shipwrecks. A monk remained resident in the oratory.

The Clarendon sank in Chale Bay in 1836, claiming 25 lives. The public was outraged, and demanded that a new lighthouse be built. Government officials who were in England and not familiar with local geography decreed that the new lighthouse should be on top of St. Catherine's Down. However, it is common for fogs to roll in and obscure the top of St. Catherine's Down, and there were more wrecks even after the new lighthouse was built. A second lighthouse, still in use, was built at the foot of the cliffs.

Chale is close to Blackgang Chine amusement park, which was opened in 1843 and was Britain's first theme park.

Chale had a school by 1784. The current school building dates from 1883, although it has been augmented by a newer hall, kitchens and a computer complex. It sits near the church and Wight Mouse Inn at the southern end of the parish. The school was the smallest on the Island, and one of the smallest in the United Kingdom with only 20 pupils on roll. This led to the threat of the school's closure, and it did close just before the summer vacation of 2010.

The Wight Mouse Inn and Clarendon Hotel is named after a shipwreck in 1835. Some of the timbers from the wreck are part of the building. It was a popular destination of the upper classes in an earlier era.

Today
Public transport is provided by Southern Vectis bus route 6, which runs between Newport and Ventnor.  The summer-only Island Coaster service also stops in Chale.

Governance
Chale is part of the electoral ward called Chale, Niton and Whitwell. At the 2011 Census the population of this ward was 2,721.

See also
St. Andrew's Church, Chale
Blackgang Chine
Chale Green

References

External links

History of Chale website

Villages on the Isle of Wight
Civil parishes in the Isle of Wight